Gilles Côté (born 24 November 1945 in Vanier, Ottawa) is a Canadian clergyman and prelate of the Roman Catholic Church who served as the bishop for the Diocese of Daru-Kiunga. He was appointed bishop in 1999. He retired in 2021.

References

External links

1945 births
Canadian Roman Catholic bishops
Roman Catholic bishops of Daru-Kiunga
Living people
People from Quebec City
Date of birth missing (living people)